Buckley School may refer to:
Buckley School (California), a school in Los Angeles
Buckley School (New York City)
Buckley Country Day School, a Roslyn, New York N-8 school